Veliatynо is a village in the Khust Raion of Zakarpattia Oblast, Ukraine. , its population was 4,576. It was formerly named Veliatyn, until 2018.

References

Villages in Khust Raion